The Balbo Monument consists of a column that is approximately 2,000 years old dating from between 117 and 38 BC and a contemporary stone base. It was taken from an ancient port town outside of Rome by Benito Mussolini and given to the city of Chicago in 1933 to honor the trans-Atlantic flight led by Italo Balbo to the Century of Progress Worlds Fair.

History 
The Balbo Monument includes a column that was taken from a site about 200 meters outside of Porta Marina in Ostia.  The building that the column originated from is called the Prospetto a Mare which translates to the Prospectus to Sea.  Due to extensive renovation that was done during the second century AD, many of the buildings throughout the settlement of Ostia were repurposed or built over.  Although this building endured through years of change and innovation, there are very few records still in existence that pertain to the building's original purpose.

Creation 

The Romans constructed the column from breccia, a type of stone created from the combination of angular gravel and the fragments of boulders.  The pillar is a greenish color, thirteen feet tall and three feet in diameter.  Two Italian architects named Capraro and Komar created the base of the monument out of travertine, a type of light colored limestone frequently used in Roman architecture.  They inscribed a message in Italian. In English the message reads:

Controversy
The monument represents a portion of history but it is also valued as a piece of art and it stands as a symbol that has very different meanings for different groups of people. 
After Benito Mussolini had the pillar removed from its original place in Ostia, he had it converted into a monument that he gave to the City of Chicago.  It was transported by boat to America and arrived in Chicago in 1934 during the Century of Progress World's fair and placed in front of the Italian Pavilion.  While the fair was eventually disassembled, the column was left standing in its original place just a short distance from the shores of Lake Michigan in an often overlooked area of Burnham Park.  This token was a tribute to the first transatlantic crossing made by the Italian air force and their general, Italo Balbo.

At the time of this celebration, relations between Fascist Italy and the United States were friendly. In fact, they had been for most of the duration of the regime. Mussolini, Grandi, Balbo and others were recurringly portrayed in a positive light on American media, with Mussolini featured on the cover of Newsweek magazine as late as May 1940. Balbo in particular was hugely popular, especially in Chicago and New York.

After the end of Second World War, the anti-fascist Italian ambassador to the United States Alberto Tarchiani requested that the tributes to Balbo be removed. Mayor Edward J. Kelly, surprised, reportedly asked: "Why? Didn't Balbo cross the Atlantic?"

Balbo's pillar endured in spite of intermittent objections. In 2017 there was discussion about removing the monument, but as of September 2021 it remains in place.

Mixed emotions about the monument survive to this day: some observers regard its link to Fascism as unacceptable, while older Chicago residents hold on to fond memories of an age of progress.

See also
 List of public art in Chicago

Further reading

 Segrè, Claudio G. 1987. Italo Balbo: a Fascist life. Berkeley: University of California Press.
 Bosworth, R. J. B. 2002. Mussolini. London: Arnold.
 Ganz, Cheryl. 2008. The 1933 Chicago World's Fair: a century of progress. Urbana: University of Illinois Press.
 Aldrete, Gregory S. 2004. Daily life in the Roman city: Rome, Pompeii, and Ostia. Westport, Conn: Greenwood Press.

References 

Benito Mussolini
Italian sculpture
Italy–United States relations
Monuments and memorials in Chicago
Outdoor sculptures in Chicago
Relocated buildings and structures in Illinois
Century of Progress